Development region  is a designation for a territorial entity.

It is used for:
 Development regions of Romania
 Development regions of Nepal

Types of administrative division
Regions